Genders is the surname of:

 William Genders (1890–1971), British cyclist in the 1920 Olympics
 Roy Genders (1913–1985), English cricketer
 Anselm Genders (1919–2008), Bishop of Bermuda
 Peter Genders (born 1959), Australian canoeist in the 1984 Olympics